Gambettola ( or ) is a comune (municipality) in the Province of Forlì-Cesena in the Italian region Emilia-Romagna, located about  southeast of Bologna and about  southeast of Forlì.

Gambettola borders the following municipalities: Cesena, Cesenatico, Gatteo, Longiano.

Demographic evolution

Culture
Gambettola is famous for its spectacular floats during the carnival season.

Gemellaggi
Gambettola is twinned with:

  Montichiari, Italy

References

External links
 www.comune.gambettola.fc.it

Cities and towns in Emilia-Romagna